Frank E. Riley was a member of the Wisconsin State Assembly.

Biography
Riley was born on March 5, 1865, in Fitzwilliam, New Hampshire. He moved to Two Rivers, Wisconsin, in 1868.

Career
Riley was a member of the Assembly from 1939 to 1946. Previously, he was Postmaster and Assessor of Two Rivers, as well as an alderman. He was a Republican.

References

People from Fitzwilliam, New Hampshire
People from Two Rivers, Wisconsin
Wisconsin city council members
Republican Party members of the Wisconsin State Assembly
Wisconsin postmasters
1865 births
Year of death missing